Seton Lake is a lake in the Squamish-Lillooet region of southwestern British Columbia. On the northeast side is Mission Ridge. On the southwest is the Cayoosh Range.

Name origin
In 1827, Francis Ermatinger of the Hudson's Bay Company (HBC), the first European explorer, referred to the Seton and Anderson lakes as the first and second Peseline Lake (various spellings). In 1846, Alexander Caulfield Anderson paddled along the lakes when seeking a new HBC fur brigade route from Fort Alexandria. In 1858, Governor James Douglas commissioned Anderson to establish a route to the goldfields during the Fraser Canyon Gold Rush. The governor encouraged Anderson to name the lakes after his family. Anderson's cousin Colonel Alexander Seton of the 74th Regiment, who was in command of the of the troops on board the HMS Birkenhead, which sank in 1852, was noted for his exemplary conduct in the moment and was among those who drowned.

The misspelling as "Seaton Lake" on Jorgensen's 1895 map was commonly repeated for decades in both newspaper accounts and government reports.

Dimensions and tributaries
The lake has not completely frozen in recent centuries but has in the past. The water is a few degrees colder than Anderson Lake.

The primary inflow (western end) and outflow (eastern end) are the Seton River. Clockwise, the main tributaries are Omin Brook, Carpenter Lake (via Mission Ridge tunnels), Tsee Creek, Ohin Creek, Olin Creek, Ptilla Creek, Puck Creek, Duguid Creek, Madelina Creek, and Audrey Creek, on the northern shore, and Machute Creek on the southern shore.

In 1979, a creek was partially diverted to mix creek water with powerhouse water, so that sockeye salmon would not lose their bearings, but instead proceed upstream to their traditional spawning grounds.

Environment
The lake is bounded by snow-capped mountains that descend abruptly to the shores. Environmental conditions largely mirror the Anderson Lake geology, topography, and climate. However, glacial silt from Carpenter Lake, entering via the power station tunnel, makes the lake water much cloudier than Anderson.

Ferries

1858–c.1864
Although a trail existed along the north shore, this section of the Douglas Road was mostly travelled via the lake, initially by canoe. Despite repairs and upgrades to this rudimentary trail over the years, the condition remained as unsuitable for livestock passage.

Built on the lake for Taylor & Co, the  paddle steamer Champion entered service in June 1860. Assumedly, this was the vessel that qualified for the $150 government grant. However, John Colbraith and John Taylor focussed on their hotel at the end of lake, leaving the day-to-day operations of the ferry to Flynn and Kelly.

In 1862, the Short Portage–Lillooet steamer fare was $1. The next year, Taylor & Co, introduced faster paddle steamers, which were the  Seaton and the  Prince Alfred.

The fate of these vessels is unclear, but the remains of the Seaton were still visible on the lakeshore in 1901.

Intermediate years
First Nations provided an informal canoe service.

c.1898–1934
An influx of gold prospectors, which overwhelmed the private boats and barges, highlighted the need for regular lake transportation. In February 1899, the  steamboat Minnehaha entered service but was destroyed in a violent storm in 1902.

A new steamer was completed in September 1900. The owners built wharves at the foot of the lake and Shalalth. The vessel was likely the  Britannia, which dominated the lake service after 1902. Its final year on the run to Mission (Shalalth) and Short Portage (Seton Portage) was 1914. In May 1912, the  gasoline engine Durban was launched for the same route. That year, the railway contractor made a daily round trip with its gasoline tug and scow. In total, one steamer and two or three gasoline launches carried freight and passengers on the lake that year. The Seton Lake Steamboat Co operated at least until November 1916, apparently with gasoline boats in later years. That summer, Capt. E.W. Cox, who operated a launch on the lake and was about to receive an operating subsidy, drowned while repairing a wharf.

Ernie Marshall and his brother operated a Lillooet–Shalalth ferry until 1934.

Railway
By late 1912, seven construction camps had been established along Seton and Anderson Lakes. The next summer, a falling rock killed a worker.

The northward advance of the Pacific Great Eastern Railway (PGE) rail head reached the western end of Seton Lake in late January 1915 and the Lillooet vicinity in mid-February.

In 1916, high water extensively damaged the track.

The stations along the north side of the lake have been as follows:

The shuttle along the lake, which commenced as Lillooet–Shalalth in 1934 and became Lillooet–Seton Portage in 1958, would stop most anywhere on request. The service became the Kaoham Shuttle in 2002.

In 1949, the construction of concrete walls eliminated five bridges along the lake.

In January 1950, an avalanche rushing down the mountainside forced a locomotive and tender into the icy lake.

In December 1964, a diesel locomotive hauling a freight train struck a rockslide on the track, derailed, and plunged into the icy lake. The engineer drowned, but two other crew swam to safety. The locomotive, which rested on a ledge  underwater, was secured a month later to prevent it from slipping to the bottom of the lake. The PGE implemented a coroner's jury recommendation that a speeder precede all  trains along the lake to check for track obstructions. In June 1965, the 120-ton locomotive was raised.

In December 1969, two locomotives and 13 cars of a 77-car freight train derailed. One car rolled into the lake and another caught fire.

In February 1980, a large rock fell upon the track after the speeder passed. On rounding a bend, a southbound 59-car freight train struck the rock, derailing the two lead locomotives and two cars. The locomotives tumbled into the lake, where one crew member swam free but one drowned. In May 1981, BC Rail raised and restored one locomotive. In April 1989, a private citizen raised the second locomotive, but BC Rail expressed no interest in it.

Canadian National Railways have operated the BC Rail line since 2004.

Recreation
The one-kilometre return Seton Lake Viewpoint hike offers the lake and mountains as a background and the switchback highway as a foreground. The Upper Bench Loop Trail provides views of Cayoosh Creek, the valley, and Seton Powerhouse. The short trail down to the lake offers lake views. The stoney Seton Lake beach has a boat launch, dock, café, canoe rental, and several picnic tables. Fishing is better in the creeks and river than the lake.

Maps

See also
Vessels of the Lakes Route

Footnotes

References

Lakes of British Columbia
Reservoirs in British Columbia
Bridge River Country
Lillooet Country